This is a list of newspapers in Ecuador.

Ambato
El Heraldo
Babahoyo
Clarín
Bahía de Caráquez
El Globo
Cuenca
 El Mercurio
 La Tarde  
 El Tiempo
Galápagos Islands
El Colono
Guayaquil
 Diario Extra  
 Diario Super
 Expreso  
 El Financiero  
 El Meridiano 
 El Metro 
 PP El Verdadero  
 La Segunda del Meridiano
 El Telégrafo 
 El Universo
Ibarra
Diario del Norte  
La Verdad
Latacunga
La Gaceta
Loja
Cronica de la tarde   
El Siglo
Macas
El Observador
Machala
El Correo
El Nacional
La Opinión
Manta
EL Mercurio de Manta  
El Metropolitano
Milagro
Prensa La Verdad  
Portoviejo
 El Diario
Quevedo
Ecos
El Planeta
Quito
 El Comercio
 La Hora
 Hoy
 Metro Hoy  
 Quito Weekly  
 Últimas Noticias
Riobamba
Los Andes
El Espectador
La Prensa  
Tulcán
La Nación

See also
List of newspapers

Further reading

External links
 

Ecuador
Newspapers published in Ecuador
Newspapers